Daniel Dwain Schoonover (October 8, 1933 – July 10, 1953) was an enlisted soldier of the United States Army during the Korean War and a posthumous recipient of the Medal of Honor at the Second Battle of Pork Chop Hill.

He was killed in action July 10, 1953 and is buried in the National Memorial Cemetery of the Pacific, Honolulu, Hawaii. Although his body is buried in Hawaii there is a cenotaph at Morris Hill Cemetery in Boise, Idaho.

Medal of Honor citation
Rank and organization: Corporal, U.S. Army, Company A, 13th Engineer Combat Battalion, 7th Infantry Division

Place and date: Near Sokkogae, Korea, 8 to July 10, 1953

Entered service at: Boise, Idaho. Born: October 8, 1933, Boise, Idaho

G.O. No.: 5, January 14, 1955

Citation: 

Cpl. Schoonover, distinguished himself by conspicuous gallantry and outstanding courage above and beyond the call of duty in action against the enemy. He was in charge of an engineer demolition squad attached to an infantry company which was committed to dislodge the enemy from a vital hill. Realizing that the heavy fighting and intense enemy fire made it impossible to carry out his mission, he voluntarily employed his unit as a rifle squad and, forging up the steep barren slope, participated in the assault on hostile positions. When an artillery round exploded on the roof of an enemy bunker, he courageously ran forward and leaped into the position, killing 1 hostile infantryman and taking another prisoner. Later in the action, when friendly forces were pinned down by vicious fire from another enemy bunker, he dashed through the hail of fire, hurled grenades in the nearest aperture, then ran to the doorway and emptied his pistol, killing the remainder of the enemy. His brave action neutralized the position and enabled friendly troops to continue their advance to the crest of the hill. When the enemy counterattacked he constantly exposed himself to the heavy bombardment to direct the fire of his men and to call in an effective artillery barrage on hostile forces. Although the company was relieved early the following morning, he voluntarily remained in the area, manned a machine gun for several hours, and subsequently joined another assault on enemy emplacements. When last seen he was operating an automatic rifle with devastating effect until mortally wounded by artillery fire. Cpl. Schoonover's heroic leadership during 2 days of heavy fighting, superb personal bravery, and willing self-sacrifice inspired his comrades and saved many lives, reflecting lasting glory upon himself and upholding the honored traditions of the military service.

See also

List of Medal of Honor recipients
List of Korean War Medal of Honor recipients

Notes

References

1933 births
1953 deaths
United States Army Medal of Honor recipients
United States Army soldiers
American military personnel killed in the Korean War
Korean War recipients of the Medal of Honor
United States Army personnel of the Korean War